Strömsbro IF is a Swedish sports club located in Gävle.

Background
Strömsbro IF currently plays football in Division 4 Gestrikland which is the sixth tier of Swedish football. They play their home matches at the Testebovallens IP in Gävle.

The club is affiliated to Gestriklands Fotbollförbund. Strömsbro IF have competed in the Svenska Cupen on 8 occasions and have played 8 matches in the competition.

The club is also active playing bandy, where the women 's team has been playing in the Swedish to-tier league.

Season to season

In their most successful period Strömsbro IF competed in the following divisions:

In recent seasons Strömsbro IF have competed in the following divisions:

Footnotes

External links
 Strömsbro IF – Official website
 Strömsbro IF on Facebook

Sport in Gävleborg County
Football clubs in Gävleborg County
Bandy clubs in Sweden
Association football clubs established in 1921
Bandy clubs established in 1921
1921 establishments in Sweden